Eriberto de Castro Leão Monteiro (born 11 June 1972) is a Brazilian actor.

Biography
Eriberto was born in São José dos Campos, in the interior of the state of São Paulo. He is the son of the designer Telma de Castro Leão Monteiro and the businessman Eriberto Monteiro.

Selected filmography

References

External links
 

1972 births
Living people
People from São José dos Campos
Brazilian male film actors
Brazilian male telenovela actors
Male actors from São Paulo (state)
20th-century Brazilian male actors
21st-century Brazilian male actors